Deadsville is a surreal, offbeat animated comedy series based in a fictional town, the eponymous "Deadsville".

Overview
Aptly named, Deadsville is where a range of celebrities who have died live as a final resting place for the famous. These include Nirvana frontman Kurt Cobain, popular English playwright William Shakespeare and rap artist Tupac Shakur. It portrayed some of their everyday activities in the town, which they seemingly have accepted as their final place of rest. Such activities include Cobain attempting to write a Christmas song, with Shakespeare and Tupac helping him both through managing and creative advice. The finished song was called, "It's Cold Outside But It's Warm In Here".

Broadcast
This was the main plot for the show's only episode, that of the pilot, broadcast on September 30, 2006, on Channel Four. The show was produced by Absolutely Productions. It was written by Carl Gorham and Moray Hunter, who had previously worked with Absolutely Productions on the sketch series, "Stressed Eric" as creators. It also featured the voice talent of Morwenna Banks, another worker for Absolutely.

The show is now discontinued.

British adult animated comedy television series